South Carolina Highway 28 Business may refer to:

South Carolina Highway 28 Business (Abbeville), a former business loop in Abbeville
South Carolina Highway 28 Business (Anderson), a business loop in Anderson
South Carolina Highway 28 Business (Clemson), a former business loop in Clemson
South Carolina Highway 28 Business (Pendleton), a business loop in Pendleton
South Carolina Highway 28 Business (Seneca), a former business loop in Seneca

028 Business
028 Business